Macall Harkins (born February 5, 1986, in Palos Verdes) is an American former professional tennis player.

She won three singles and nine doubles titles on the ITF Circuit in her career. On 27 September 2010, she reached her best singles ranking of world No. 377. On 10 October 2011, she peaked at No. 222 in the doubles rankings.

ITF Circuit finals

Singles: 3 (3 titles)

Doubles: 15 (9 titles, 6 runner-ups)

References

External links
 
 

American female tennis players
Living people
1986 births
Sportspeople from Los Angeles County, California
Tennis people from California
People from Palos Verdes, California
21st-century American women